Mamoun or Mamun may refer to the following people

Given name
Mamoun
Maumoon Abdul Gayoom (born 1937), politician from Maldives
Mamoun Beheiry (1925–2002), Sudanese economist
Mamoun Darkazanli (born 1958), German-Syrian terrorist
Mamoun Elyounoussi (born 1987), Dutch actor 
Mamoun Fandy, Egyptian-born American scholar
Mamoun Hassan, British screenwriter, director, editor and producer 
Mamoun Sakkal, Syrian artist and calligrapher

Mamun
Mamun Chowdhury (born 1961), Bangladeshi-born British businessman
Mamun Khan (born 1985), Bangladeshi football player
Mamun Mahmud (1928–1971), Bangladeshi police officer

Surname
Mamoun
Guy Bertrand Ngon Mamoun (born 1983), Cameroonian football player
Hassan Mamoun (1894–1973), Egyptian jurist, Grand Imam and Grand Mufti 
Rania Mamoun (born 1979), Sudanese journalist, novelist and writer
Marella Mamoun (born 1982), Syrian Olympic swimmer
Mohammed esh Sheikh el Mamun, 17th century Sultan of Morocco
Saad Mamoun (1922–2000), Egyptian military officer

Mamun
 Al-Ma'mun (Abū Jaʿfar Abdullāh al-Ma'mūn ibn Hārūn al-Rashīd, 786-833), Abbasid caliph
Abdullah al Mamun (1942—2008), Bangladeshi playwright, actor and filmmaker
A A Mamun, Bangladeshi physicist
Mamunul Islam Mamun (born 1988), Bangladeshi international footballer
Margarita Mamun (born 1995), Russian-Bengali rhythmic gymnast
Mohd Mamun Miah (born 1987), Bangladeshi football player
Nasir Ali Mamun (born 1953), Bangladeshi portrait photographer 
Syed Mir Ali Imam Al Mamun (born 1950), Bangladeshi military officer